Art Johnson (6-16-1888 Sioux City, Iowa –  8-27-1949, Dothan, Alabama, was an American racecar driver.

Indy 500 results

References

1880s births
1949 deaths
American racing drivers
Indianapolis 500 drivers
Sportspeople from Sioux City, Iowa
Racing drivers from Iowa